The HTH-XRE RNA motif is a conserved RNA structure that was discovered by bioinformatics.
HTH-XRE motifs are found in Clostridiales.

HTH-XRE RNAs are often found upstream of genes encoding proteins with the XRE-like helix-turn-helix protein domain.  However, in many cases, HTH-XRE RNAs are not upstream of a protein-coding gene.  Additionally, genes encoding XRE-like domains are extremely common in bacteria, so it is possible that the association between this protein domain and the HTH-XRE RNA arises purely by coincidence.  Overall, it is ambiguous whether HTH-XRE RNAs function as cis-regulatory elements or whether they operate in trans as small RNAs.

References

Non-coding RNA